LYSF may refer to:

Homoaconitate hydratase
Lift Your Skinny Fists Like Antennas to Heaven, 2000 album by Godspeed You! Black Emperor